Horns Mill Weir is a weir on the River Lea, next to Horns Mill, Hertford.

Weirs on the River Lea
Weirs in Hertfordshire